The Royal Lancaster Infirmary (RLI) is a hospital in the city of Lancaster, England. It lies to the south of the city centre, between the A6 road and the Lancaster Canal. It is managed by the University Hospitals of Morecambe Bay NHS Foundation Trust.

History
The infirmary has its origins in a dispensary which opened on Castle Hill in 1781 and a fever hospital established in 1815. These two institutions combined in premises in Thurnham Street in 1833.

A larger site on Ashton Road, which had previously been known as the Springfield Estate, was bought for £2,471 in 1888 and, following a donation of nearly £10,000 by James Williamson, a local businessman, the first building of the new hospital, designed by architects Paley and Austin, was opened by the Duke and Duchess of York in 1896. Springfield Hall was retained and used as an overnight nurses' home for the hospital.

A new maternity unit opened in 1979, the pathology building was added in 1994 and the new centenary building opened in 1996.

The Huggett Suite, a unit for treating stroke patients built at a cost of £1 million, opened in spring 2017 and a new therapies outpatient department, built at a cost of £1.2 million, opened in 2018.

Performance
An inspection by the Care Quality Commission (CQC) published in February 2017 gave the hospital a good overall rating with caring graded as outstanding but with patient safety requiring improvement.

See also

Listed buildings in Lancaster, Lancashire
 List of hospitals in England

References

External links

Royal Lancaster Infirmary at NHS Choices
Royal Lancaster Infirmary at Care Quality Commission website

Hospital buildings completed in 1833
Hospitals in Lancashire
NHS hospitals in England
Teaching hospitals in England
Grade II listed hospital buildings
Grade II listed buildings in Lancashire
Paley, Austin and Paley buildings